Beira Interior Norte is a former Portuguese subregion (NUTS level 3) in the Centro Region. It was abolished at the January 2015 NUTS 3 revision. It was also part of an urban community (ComUrb) called Beiras. The capital and most important city was Guarda (city population approximately 32,000). Other towns with Portuguese city status (cidade) included: Pinhel (3,500), Sabugal (3,200), Trancoso (3,000) and Mêda (2,004).

The subregion had 9 municipalities and its population was 112,766 (2005 statistics).

Municipalities
The municipalities are:
 Almeida
 Celorico da Beira
 Figueira de Castelo Rodrigo
 Guarda
 Manteigas
 Mêda
 Pinhel
 Sabugal
 Trancoso

References

Former NUTS 3 statistical regions of Portugal
Geography of Guarda District